FKJ may refer to:
 FK Jagodina, a Serbian football club
 Fukui Airport, in Japan
 French Kiwi Juice, a French musician